William Charles Kernot (16 June 1845 – 14 March 1909), was an Australian engineer, first professor of engineering at the University of Melbourne and president of the Royal Society of Victoria.

Early life and family
William Charles Kernot, eldest son of Charles Kernot, chemist, formerly member of the Victorian Legislative Assembly for Geelong, was born at Rochford, Essex, England. Kernot migrated to Australia with his family in 1851 and was educated at the National Grammar School, Geelong, and matriculated at the University of Melbourne in 1861. He qualified for the degree of M.A. in 1864 and entered the Victorian mining department in 1865. He also qualified as a civil engineer in 1866.

Commercial career
In 1867 joined the water-supply department, and in 1868 was appointed a lecturer in civil engineering at the University of Melbourne. He left the water-supply department in 1875, and during the next three years acted as consulting engineer to Louis Brennan in connexion with his torpedo. In 1882 Kernot became chairman of directors of the first company to introduce electric lighting to Melbourne.

Academic career
From 1 January 1883, Kernot was the first professor of engineering at the University of Melbourne. When he started there was little in the way of either buildings or equipment, but during the following 26 years he worked up a fine engineering school, and was an inspiring teacher and friend to the many students who qualified for engineering degrees during this period. In 1887 he gave £2000 to the university to found scholarships in natural philosophy and chemistry, and in 1893 gave £1000 for the fittings for the metallurgical laboratory.

Kernot also assisted Francis Ormond in the organization of the Working Men's College of Melbourne, and was president of this institution from 1889 to 1899. Kernot was president of the Royal Society of Victoria 1895-1900 and of the Victorian Society of Engineers in 1897-8 and 1906-7.

Kernot wrote many papers for technical journals; an important work was On Some Common Errors in Iron Bridge Design, which appeared in 1898, an enlarged second edition was published in 1906. A younger brother, Wilfred Noyce Kernot, born in 1868, was for many years a lecturer at the University of Melbourne, and from 1932 to 1936 was professor of engineering.

Personal life
Kernot was president of the Wallaby Club in 1901.  He was also interested in astronomy, member of the British Astronomical Association from 1897 May 26 until his death. (Journal British Astronomical Association, vol. 7).

Late life and legacy
Kernot passed at Melbourne on 14 March 1909. He never married.

The Kernot Memorial Medal, awarded to Australian engineers, was instituted in his honour.

In-line citations

External links
 Kernot, William Charles in the Bright Sparcs Biographical Database.
 Work in Open Library

Australian civil engineers
Engineers from Melbourne
1845 births
1909 deaths
Australian Baptists
19th-century Baptists